The archaeology of Anglo-Saxon England is the study of the archaeology of England from the 5th Century AD to the 11th Century, when it was ruled by Germanic tribes known collectively as the Anglo-Saxons.

History and overview 
The Anglo-Saxon period is broadly defined as the period of time from roughly 410 AD to 1066 AD. The first modern, systemic excavations of Anglo-Saxon cemeteries and settlements began in the 1920s. Since then, archaeological surveys of cemeteries and settlements have uncovered more information about the society and culture of Anglo-Saxon England.

Reverend James Douglas was the first antiquarian to recognize Anglo-Saxon burials for what they were, and he described his findings in Nenia Britannica (1793). Interest in Anglo-Saxon materials increased in the 19th Century, with scholars like the archaeologist Thomas Bateman and the architect Thomas Rickman producing some of the earliest authoritative texts on the subject.

Architecture 

Anglo-Saxon architecture is characterized by rectangular, timber buildings such as houses and halls. The construction of stone defenses and monuments became more common in the late 10th and 11th Century AD, but urban buildings continued to be made of timber.

Art and jewelry 

Anglo-Saxon art is best known for its examples of sophisticated metalwork and jewelry, as well as carvings and illuminated manuscripts. Anglo-Saxon art was influenced by Germanic art and Celtic art. Interactions with cultures from regions like the Mediterranean and early Christian Ireland also influenced Anglo-Saxon arts.

In December 2019, Roman and Anglo-Saxon artifacts, including pottery, jugs, and jewelry, were unearthed from burial grounds by archaeologists led by Nigel Page at Baginton. The team of researchers believed that two of the graves belonged to a "high-status" rank officer and a Roman girl aged 6-12 years old. Findings from the Roman cremation burial site of a young girl included four brooches, a ring with an image of a cicada and a hair pin.

In August 2021, archaeologists headed by Gabor Thomas from the University of Reading announced the discovery of a monastery dated back to the reign of Queen Cynethryth in the grounds of Holy Trinity Church in the village of Cookham in Berkshire. They also found items including food remains, pottery vessels used for cooking and eating, a fine bronze bracelet and a dress pin.

Burial

One of the most well-known aspects of early Anglo-Saxon society is their burial customs. Archaeological excavations at various sites include Sutton Hoo, Spong Hill, Prittlewell, Snape and Walkington Wold. Around 1200 Anglo-Saxon pagan cemeteries have been discovered. There was no set form of burial amongst the pagan Anglo-Saxons, with cremation being preferred amongst the Angles in the north and inhumation amongst the Saxons in the south, although both forms were found throughout England, sometimes in the same cemeteries. When cremation did take place, the ashes were usually placed within an urn and then buried, sometimes along with grave goods. Free Anglo-Saxon men were buried with at least one weapon in the pagan tradition, often a seax, but sometimes also with a spear, sword or shield, or a combination of these. Wealthy individuals were buried with rich grave goods. There are also various recorded cases of animal skulls, particularly oxen but also pig, being buried in human graves, a practice that was also found in earlier Roman Britain.

Eventually, in the 6th and 7th centuries, burial mounds began to appear in Anglo-Saxon England, and in certain cases earlier burial mounds from the Neolithic, Bronze Age, Iron Age and Romano-British periods were simply reused by the Anglo-Saxons. It is not known why they adopted this practice, but it may be from the practices of the native Britons. Burial mounds remained objects of veneration in early Anglo-Saxon Christianity, and numerous churches were built next to tumuli. Another form of burial was that of ship burials, which were practised by many of the Germanic peoples across northern Europe. In many cases it seems that the corpse was placed within a ship which was then either sent out to sea or left on land, but in both cases then set alight. In Suffolk however, ships were not burned, but buried, as is the case at Sutton Hoo, which is believed to have been the resting place of the king of the East Angles, Rædwald. Both ship and tumulus burials were described in the Beowulf poem, through the funerals of Scyld Scefing and Beowulf respectively.

There are also many cases where corpses have been found decapitated, for instance, at a mass grave in Thetford, Norfolk, fifty beheaded individuals were discovered, their heads possibly having been taken as trophies of war. In other cases of decapitation it seems possible that it was evidence of human sacrifice or execution.

In September 2020, archaeologists announced the discovery of a Sutton Hoo-era Anglo-Saxon cemetery with 17 cremations and 191 burials dating back to the 7th century in Oulton, near Lowestoft. The graves contained the remains of men, women and children, as well as artefacts including small iron knives and silver pennies, wrist clasps, strings of amber and glass beads. According to Andrew Peachey, who carried out the excavations, the skeletons had mostly vanished because of the highly acidic soil. They, fortunately, were preserved as brittle shapes and “sand silhouettes” in the sand.

In September 2021, archaeologists from LP-Archaeology led by Rachel Wood, have announced discovery of remains of St. Mary’s Old Church which dates back to 1080 in Stoke Mandeville. They unearthed flint walls forming a square structure, enclosed by a circular borderline and burials while working on the route of the HS2 high-speed railway.

Notable sites 

 Sutton Hoo
 West Stow Anglo-Saxon Village
 Yeavering
 Taplow Barrow
 Mucking (archaeological site)
 Prittlewell royal Anglo-Saxon burial
 Walkington Wold burials
 Staffordshire Hoard
 Canterbury-St Martin's hoard
 Snape

See also

Anglo-Saxon hoards
Anglo-Saxon numismatics
Anglo-Saxon glass

References